Major General Richard William Howard Howard Vyse (25 July 1784 – 8 June 1853) was a British soldier and Egyptologist. He was also Member of Parliament (MP) for Beverley (from 1807 to 1812) and Honiton (from 1812 to 1818).

Family life
Richard William Howard Vyse, born on 25 July 1784 at Stoke Poges, Buckinghamshire, was the only son of General Richard Vyse and his wife, Anne, the only surviving daughter and heiress of Field-marshal Sir George Howard.       
Richard William Howard Vyse assumed the additional name of Howard by royal sign-manual in September 1812 and became Richard William Howard Howard Vyse on inheriting the estates of Boughton and Pitsford in Northamptonshire through his maternal grandmother, Lucy, daughter of Thomas Wentworth, 1st Earl of Strafford (1672–1739).

He married, 13 November 1810 Frances, second daughter of Henry Hesketh of Newton, Cheshire. By her he had eight sons and two daughters; among his children were Lt Frederick Howard Vyse RN and Windsor MP Richard Howard-Vyse. Vyse died at Stoke Poges, Buckinghamshire, on 8 June 1853. His will was proved on 13 August 1853 at the Prerogative Court of Canterbury.

Military career
Howard Vyse was commissioned as cornet into the 1st Dragoons in 1800. He transferred to the 15th Light Dragoons as a Lieutenant in 1801 and was promoted Captain in 1802 and Major in 1813. In 1815 he transferred to the 87th Foot and in 1816 to the 2nd Life Guards, and then also to the 1st West India in 1819. He was promoted brevet Lieutenant-Colonel in 1825, later nominated to rank put onto half-pay in 1825, Colonel in 1837, and Major-General in 1846.

In 1809 he acted as aide-de-camp to his father on the staff of the Yorkshire district, and on 5 July 1810 received the honorary degree of D.C.L. from Oxford University. On 2 October 1840, Vyse undertook an official duty as the Colonel of the Life Guards in the mourning party for HRH Princess Augusta Sophia, to whom he had dedicated his book, Operations carried on at the Pyramids of Gizeh in 1837.

Parliamentary career
Vyse was elected to Parliament for Beverley in Yorkshire, a borough whose elections were frequently contested, in 1807. Two months after the election Philip Staple, the losing candidate, petitioned Parliament, accusing Vyse (along with the other winning candidate, John Wharton) of bribery and corruption during the election campaign. The Select Committee to which the petition was referred declined to void the result of the election in Staple's favour. Some sixteen years after Vyse's death, evidence surfaced that most of his voters had been paid: £3.8s for a plumper and £1.14s for a split vote. Payments made after an election (as these were) were not deemed bribery under the 1729 Bribery Act (and relevant case law) and were not considered by Parliamentary Select Committees to be grounds for voiding an election.

In October 1812, Vyse exchanged his seat at Beverley for Honiton in Devonshire. On this occasion Vyse was elected unopposed as the potential third candidate, Samuel Colleton Graves, of Hembury Fort, near Honiton, invited to stand, chose instead to stand elsewhere. Vyse held this seat until the dissolution of Parliament in 1818.

He also served as High Sheriff of Buckinghamshire in 1830.

Egyptologist

Pyramids of Giza
Vyse first visited Egypt in 1835 and in 1836 joined the excavations of Giovanni Battista Caviglia at Giza. Vyse found Caviglia "unproductive" and in 1837 teamed with engineer John Shae Perring in an effort to explore and document the pyramids. Their work culminated in the publishing of the Pyramids of Gizeh and the Operations carried on at the pyramids of Gizeh which the latter also includes an appendix of Vyse's account of travelling to Lower Egypt.

Vyse's "gunpowder archaeology" made one highly notable discovery in the Great Pyramid of Giza. Giovanni Battista Caviglia had blasted on the south side of the stress-relieving chamber (Davison's Chamber) on top of the King's Chamber, a chamber discovered by Nathaniel Davison in 1765, hoping to find a link to the southern air channel. But while Caviglia gave up, Vyse suspected that there was another chamber on top of Davison's Chamber, since he could insert a reed "for about two feet" upwards through a crack into a cavity. He therefore blasted straight up on the northern side, over three and a half months, finding four additional chambers. Vyse named these chambers after important friends and colleagues; Wellington's Chamber (Arthur Wellesley, 1st Duke of Wellington), Nelson's Chamber (Vice-Admiral Horatio Nelson), Lady Arbuthnot's Chamber (Anne Fitzgerald, wife of Sir Robert Keith Arbuthnot, 2nd Baronet) and Campbell's Chamber (Patrick Campbell, the British agent and Consul General in Egypt).

Vyse's version of events with regards to the discovery of Wellington's Chamber was contested by Caviglia in a series of letters in which the Italian claimed he had informed Vyse of his suspicion that there was likely another chamber directly above Davison's Chamber. According to Caviglia Vyse then betrayed his confidence on this matter and subsequently had Caviglia removed from the Giza site in order to claim the discovery for himself. In response to Caviglia's accusation, Vyse issued a strong rebuttal, dismissing Caviglia's charge.

Vyse also discovered numerous graffiti in the chambers dating from the time the pyramids were built. Along with lines, markers, and directional notations were the names of various work gangs who cut and transported the stone blocks. All of these work gang names contained a variant of the pharaoh's name i.e. Khufu, Khnum-Khuf and Medjedu, the first two of which were contained within the distinctive royal cartouche. While most of these gang names were concentrated in Lady Arbuthnot's and Campbell's Chamber, all four chambers opened by Vyse contained graffiti (or more correctly "quarry-marks" as Vyse called them). while the previously discovered Davison's Chamber contained none.

The now famous instance of Pharaoh Khufu's name is found on the south ceiling towards the west end of Campbell's Chamber. The Khufu cartouche is part of a short inscription that reads Ḫwfw śmrw ˤpr ("the gang, Companions of Khufu"), i.e. one of the gangs of workmen that constructed the chamber. Though the cartouche of Khufu is obscured by blocks or was cut off, this same gang name is also found several feet away on the last ceiling block. Vyse also depicts a partial Khufu cartouche on the North side of the chamber. Vyse had the graffiti copied by his assistant, J. R. Hill, and sent them to Samuel Birch, the Keeper of Antiquities at the British Museum who, at the time, was one of the very few scholars able to translate Egyptian hieroglyphs. Birch was able to identify this cartouche as belonging to Suphis/Cheops as it had previously been identified by the Italian scholar, Ippolito Rosellini, thereby confirming Khufu's involvement with the Great Pyramid – an association which had, until then, been reported only by Herodotus who records Khufu as the builder of the structure.

Several compound cartouches of the similarly famous "Khnum-Khufu" royal name, also part of work gang graffiti, are found in Lady Arbuthnot's Chamber, with more examples of the gang name found in Nelson's Chamber and Wellington's Chamber.

Today these chambers also contain a fair amount of 19th and 20th century graffiti, most of which is concentrated in the topmost Campbell's Chamber.

Publications

References

Attribution

External links 
 
 
 Howard-Vyse Manuscripts at the Centre for Buckinghamshire Studies.

1784 births
1853 deaths
19th-century British archaeologists
British Army generals
1st The Royal Dragoons officers
15th The King's Hussars officers
British Life Guards officers
87th (Royal Irish Fusiliers) Regiment of Foot officers
West India Regiment officers
English engineers
English archaeologists
English Egyptologists
British anthropologists
High Sheriffs of Buckinghamshire
Members of the Parliament of the United Kingdom for English constituencies
UK MPs 1812–1818
UK MPs 1807–1812
Members of the Parliament of the United Kingdom for Honiton
Great Pyramid of Giza